

Oregon Legislative Assembly 
The following table shows all primary candidates for the Oregon state legislature in 2006. For the general election, see Oregon statewide elections, 2006#Results.

Judicial races 

 Primary
Oregon primary